"Graduation Afternoon" is a short story by American writer Stephen King, originally published in the March 2007 issue of Postscripts, and collected in King's 2008 collection Just After Sunset.  The story tells of a young woman enjoying her wealthy boyfriend's high school graduation party at his suburban Connecticut home when events take an unexpected turn.

Film adaptation

The story was adapted into a short film in 2019 as part of Dollar Baby and released in 2021. The film was directed by Rob Padilla Jr. and starred George Jac, Jade Kaiser, Diane Sargent, Noor Razooky and Brian Patrick Butler.

See also
Short fiction by Stephen King

References

External links
 Graduation Afternoon at Stephen King's official site

Short stories by Stephen King
2007 short stories
Horror short stories
Fiction about nuclear war and weapons